The 7th World Festival of Youth and Students featured an athletics competition among its programme of events. The events were contested in Vienna, Austria in August 1957. Mainly contested among Eastern European athletes, it served as an alternative to the more Western European-oriented 1959 Universiade held in Turin the same year.

Four reigning men's champions from the 1958 European Athletics Championships were present at the competition: high jumper Richard Dahl, long jumper Igor Ter-Ovanesyan, javelin thrower Janusz Sidło and discus thrower Edmund Piątkowski (the latter a world record holder at the time). Sidło's fifth win in Union Internationale des Étudiants (UIE) competition made him the most successful individual athlete of the competition's history.

In the women's competition, Vera Krepkina did a 100 metres/long jump double and she became Olympic champion in the latter event a year later. The emerging Tamara Press dominated the shot put and discus throw (a year later she became an Olympic champion in both disciplines). Iolanda Balaș, reigning European champion at the time, retained her high jump title for a fourth straight UIE win.

Medal summary

Men

Women

Medal table

References

Results
World Student Games (UIE). GBR Athletics. Retrieved on 2014-12-09.

World Festival of Youth and Students
World Festival of Youth and Students
World Festival of Youth and Students
World Festival of Youth and Students
Sport in Vienna
1959